Stilwell Stone House is a historic home located at Rochester in Ulster County, New York.  It is a -story dwelling built about 1795 in a linear plan.  Also on the property is a 19th-century barn.

It was listed on the National Register of Historic Places in 1999.

References

Houses on the National Register of Historic Places in New York (state)
Houses completed in 1795
Houses in Ulster County, New York
National Register of Historic Places in Ulster County, New York